The School of History, Classics and Archaeology at the University of Edinburgh is a school within the College of Humanities and Social Science.

Location
The school is located in the William Robertson Wing of the Old Medical School buildings on Teviot Place.

History
Classics have been taught at the university since its foundation in 1583. The school has the oldest established Chair in Scottish History. Several well-known archaeologists have graduated and taught at the school.

Notable alumni and former staff
Notable members of Edinburgh University's School of History, Classics and Archaeology:

 Lord Abercromby – author of distinguished research on Bronze Age pottery. 
 Abercromby Professors of Archaeology
 Vere Gordon Childe – first holder of the Abercromby Chair
 Stuart Piggott – second holder of the Abercromby Chair
 Dr Robert Munro – a distinguished medical practitioner who, in his later life, became a keen archaeologist.
 Sir Tom Devine – an academic celebrity in Scotland for his reinvigorating of interest and research into Scotland's past. Knighted for services to Scottish History.
 Rt. Hon. Gordon Brown – former Prime Minister of the United Kingdom and Member of Parliament for Kirkcaldy and Cowdenbeath who also served as Chancellor
 Rt. Hon. Amber Rudd – former Member of Parliament for Hastings & Rye who served as Home Secretary and Secretary of State for Work and Pensions.

Publications
The School of History, Classics and Archaeology currently publishes the Journal of Lithic Studies.

External links 
 School of History, Classics and Archaeology Home Page
 Archaeology
 Classics
 History

References 

Schools of the University of Edinburgh
History education
History institutes
Archaeological research institutes
History organisations based in the United Kingdom